The 1856 American National Convention was held in National Hall in Philadelphia, Pennsylvania, on February 22 to 25, 1856. The American Party, formerly the Native American Party, was the vehicle of the Know Nothing movement. The convention resulted in the nomination of former President Millard Fillmore of New York for president and former Ambassador Andrew Jackson Donelson of Tennessee for vice president.

Background 
The American Party absorbed most of the former Whig Party in 1854, and by 1855 it had established itself as the chief opposition party to the Democrats. In the 82 races for the House of Representatives in 1854, the American Party ran 76 candidates, 35 of whom won. None of the six Independents or Whigs who ran in these races was elected. The party then succeeded in electing Nathaniel P. Banks as Speaker of the House in the 34th Congress.

Missouri Compromise Line Resolution 
Following the decision by party leaders in 1855 not to press the slavery issue, the convention had to decide how to deal with the Ohio chapter of the party, which was vocally anti-slavery. The convention closed the Ohio chapter and re-opened it under more moderate leadership. Delegates from Ohio, Pennsylvania, Illinois, Iowa, New England, and other Northern states bolted when a resolution declaring that no candidate that opposed prohibiting slavery north of the 36'30' parallel would be granted the nomination was voted down. This removed a greater part of the American Party's support in the North outside of New York, where the conservative faction of the Whig Party remained faithful.

Presidential nomination

Presidential candidates 

After the most intense excitement had prevailed, the Convention agreed to a motion of Mr. Ely to proceed to an informal vote for nomination. Former Governor Johnston received 14 votes, but before the vote was closed he announced that he was not a candidate, whereupon several members changed their votes for other parties. The result of the informal ballot placed Fillmore in first place with 71 votes. Mr. Norris of Delaware withdrew the name of Senator Clayton and said his state was now united for Fillmore.

The vote for president was then proceeded with, the name of each member being called, each state being entitled to its vote in the Electoral College, the absentees, to be voted for proportionately by the votes cast; no state not represented to be entitled to vote. The unofficial first ballot saw Fillmore increase his strength to 114 votes. It was at this point that various delegates changed their votes to Fillmore. The official first ballot saw former President Millard Fillmore nominated for president with 179 votes out of the 242 votes cast.

Mr. Scraggs, the delegate from New York who had placed Law in nomination, moved that Fillmore be declared the unanimous choice of the Convention. The motion being put, it was carried by a tremendous shout of ayes. 

Presidential Balloting / 3rd Day of Convention (February 25, 1856)

Vice Presidential nomination

Vice Presidential candidates 

In a nominating speech which eulogized him as a man of truth, courage and ability, General Call was put before the Convention as a vice presidential candidate. But the former territorial governor declined the honor and begged to be permitted to present one ore acceptable. He proposed the name of Andrew Jackson Donelson and it was received with immense applause. Former Representative Rayner of North Carolina and Representative Percy Walker of Alabama were also placed in nomination.

The Convention then proceeded to ballot for a candidate for vice president. The ballot for a candidate for the vice presidency was attended with much excitement and frequent changes of votes created difficulty in making a correct record. In addition to the names placed in nomination, the following individuals received votes: William R. Smith of Alabama, Alexander Stuart of Virginia and Henry Gardner of Massachusetts. But after the vote had been called, delegates from various states arose and changed their votes in favor of Donelson.

Mr. Donelson, having received a majority of the votes for the vice presidency, was declared duly nominated for that position. On motion, and amid much applause, the nomination was made unanimous.

North American Seceders Party nomination 

A group of North American delegates called the North American Seceders withdrew from the convention and met separately. They objected to the attempt to work with the Republican Party. The Seceders held their own national convention on 6/16-17/1856. 19 delegates unanimously nominated Robert F. Stockton for president and Kenneth Raynor for vice-president. The Seceders' ticket later withdrew from the contest, with Stockton endorsing Millard Fillmore for the Presidency.

References 

American National Convention
Political conventions in Philadelphia
American National Convention
American National Convention
American National Convention
American National Convention